No. 466 Squadron RAAF was a Royal Australian Air Force (RAAF) bomber squadron during World War II. Formed in the United Kingdom in late 1942, the squadron undertook combat operations in Europe until the end of the war, flying heavy bomber aircraft. Following the conclusion of hostilities with Germany, the squadron began retraining to undertake operations in the Pacific against the Japanese, but the war came to an end before it left the UK. In late 1945, the squadron was disbanded.

History
The squadron was formed at RAF Driffield in Yorkshire, England, on 10 October 1942, under Article XV of the Empire Air Training Scheme. The majority of its original personnel were from British Commonwealth air forces other than the RAAF. Their replacement by Australians was a gradual process and it was only towards the end of the war that the squadron's personnel were predominantly members of the RAAF.

After the squadron had been equipped with Vickers Wellington medium bombers, it transferred to RAF Leconfield, also in Yorkshire, on 27 December 1942 and flew its first mission on 13 January 1943. Its main roles were strategic bombing over Germany and laying naval mines in the North Sea. The squadron had its first direct encounter with the Luftwaffe on 14 February 1943 when, during a raid on Cologne, a Wellington Mk.X, serial number HE506, identification "HD-N", opened fire on a Junkers Ju 88 night fighter, while it was over either Turnhout Belgium, or the Dutch island of Tholen (sources differ). The crew reported seeing a brilliant flash after the rear gunner, Sergeant Angus, opened fire on it and the Junkers was claimed as probably destroyed.

Following a mission on 14 April 1943, four members of the crew of a 466 Sqn Wellington Mk.X, HZ256, "HD-L", commanded by Sergeant Edward Hicks (Auxiliary Air Force) received medals. A Distinguished Service Order (DSO) was awarded to Pilot Officer Raymond Hopkins (RAFVR), a Distinguished Flying Cross (DFC) went to Flying Officer Reginald Clayton (RAFVR), a Distinguished Flying Medal (DFM) to Sergeant Frederick Blair (RAF) and a Conspicuous Gallantry Medal (CGM) to Hicks. According to the RAAF Museum, the award of so many decorations to a single crew was "highly unusual". The awards were gazetted on 14 May 1943, with a joint citation (see below). Following subsequent operations, Hicks received further decorations and acclaim.

466 Sqn converted to the Handley Page Halifax heavy bomber in late 1943. In June 1944, the squadron returned to Driffield. From May 1944, operations were focussed on German infrastructure in France, such as coastal artillery batteries and railway marshalling yards, in preparation for the invasion of Europe.

Flying Officer Joe Herman (RAAF), the captain of a 466 Sqn Halifax B.Mk.III, narrowly escaped death in a remarkable incident on 4 November 1944. During a night mission over Germany, his aircraft (LV936, "HD-D"), was badly damaged by Flak. After ordering the crew to bail out, Herman was blown out of the plane, without a parachute. After falling a long way, possibly more than 3,000 metres, Herman fell onto the Halifax's mid-upper gunner, F/O John Vivash (RAAF), and grabbed one of his legs. Both men descended on one parachute, suffered minor injuries when landing and survived the war as prisoners of war. From a total crew of seven, only one other airman, Sgt H. W. Knott (RAF), survived. According to one source, at least three crew members were murdered after being captured.

In May 1945, following the end of the war in Europe, the squadron dumped surplus bombs into the sea and began re-training at RAF Bassingbourn, in Cambridgeshire, as a transport unit. Some sources state that the squadron was renumbered as No. 10 Squadron RAAF on 20 June 1945, while others say the squadron operated as a combined unit with No. 10 Sqn. It was re-converting to Consolidated Liberator heavy bombers when Japan surrendered, whereupon the squadron was disbanded at RAF Bassingbourn on 26 October 1945.

466 Sqn flew 3,326 sorties against 269 different targets, dropping 8,804 tons of bombs and laying 442 tons of mines. A total of 81 aircraft were lost and 184 RAAF personnel serving with the squadron were killed.

Aircraft operated

Squadron bases

Commanding officers

References

Notes

Book: 'The Last Flight of "Yvonne Proudbag"' By Cynrik De Decker & Jean Louis Roba. With an English translation, this book details how a Wellington bomber crew was shot down whilst returning from a sortie in May 1943. None survived but the wreckage is now considered a shrine in honour of these brave men of 466 Sqd, who will always be remembered by the grateful people of Vollezelle (SW of Brussels, Belgium).

Bibliography

External links

 "466 Squadron RAAF" Australian War Memorial, 1997–2008
 Troy Cosgrove's "A History of 466 Squadron RAAF"
 J. Rickard, 2007, "No. 466 Squadron (RAAF): Second World War" (historyofwar.org)
 "466 Squadron". RAAF Museum, 2007
 Squadron history on RAF website
 Lost Bombers, 2007, "Halifax LV936 Information" (lostbombers.co.uk)

Military units and formations established in 1942
Military units and formations disestablished in 1945
466 Squadron